Silveyra is a Spanish surname. Notable people with the surname include:

Luciana Silveyra (born 1976), Mexican actress
Patricia Silveyra (born 1981), Argentine-American lung physiologist and professor
Soledad Silveyra (born 1952), Argentine actress

Spanish-language surnames